Potadoma freethi is a species of gastropod belonging to the family Pachychilidae.

The species is found in Africa and Caribbean.

References

Pachychilidae